Josh Simm (born 27 February 2001) is an English professional rugby league footballer who plays as a  or er for the Wynnum Manly Seagulls in the Queensland Cup.

He previously played for St Helens in the Super League, where he spent time on loan at Leigh and Hull FC.

Background
Simm was born in St Helens, England. He is the grandson of St Helens legend Geoff Pimblett.

Career
In the 2019 under 19s academy season, Simm scored a total of 30 tries in 20 games, beating his previous season's total of 29 tries in 23 games.

Simm made his Super League début for Saints against the London Broncos in July 2019.

Simm would go on to score his first Super League try in round 17 of the 2020 Super League season vs Leeds Rhinos, where he scored a hat-trick in a man of the match performance.

Leigh Centurions
On 13 April 2021 it was reported that he had signed for Leigh in the Super League on a short-term loan

2022
Simm made seven appearances for the St Helens in 2022 including the Challenge Cup semi-final defeat to Wigan Warriors. The outside back also made a further five Super League appearances for Hull FC where he spent the second half of last season on loan, scoring two tries.

In October, St Helens announced Simm would be moving on elsewhere. On 24 October, Serious About Rugby League revealed Simm had sign in Australia in the Queeensland Cup for the [[Wynnum Manly Seagulls for the 2023 season.

References

External links
St Helens profile
SL profile
Saints Heritage Society profile

2001 births
Living people
English rugby league players
Hull F.C. players
Leigh Leopards players
Rugby league centres
Rugby league players from St Helens, Merseyside
St Helens R.F.C. players
Wynnum Manly Seagulls players